Tsarevich Peter Petrovich (15 November 1715 - 19 April 1719) was a Russian Tsarevich who was heir to the Russian throne from February 1718 upon the removal of his older half brother, Alexis Petrovich to his death in 1719. His parents were Tsar Peter I and the future Catherine I. In 1732, a pretender emerged claiming to be the dead Tsarevich.

Early life 

Peter Petrovich was born on 15 November 1715 in Saint Petersburg as the son of Tsar Peter I and Tsaritsa and future Empress Catherine I. Just over three weeks before his birth, Tsarevich Alexis Petrovich, Peter’s older half brother had a son, Peter Alexeyevich who would later become Peter II. Because Peter Alexeyevich had been born first, it was considered odd that Peter Petrovich was baptized as Peter when his nephew was still alive.

Tsarevich 
In 1715, Tsarevich Alexis tried to flee but was brought back in 1718 and investigated, he was tortured and forced to renounce his rights to the Russian throne and recognize Peter Petrovich as the new Tsarevich and heir apparent. By autumn, the new Tsarevich hadn't even spoken or walked yet.

Death 
Peter Petrovich died on 19 April 1719 in Saint Petersburg and was firstly buried in the  Church of the Resurrection of Lazarus of the Alexander Nevsky Monastery, in 1723 he was reburied in the Annunciation Church leading to rumors that Tsar Peter had another son named Peter Petrovich born in 1719 but this was later proven false. Peter Petrovich’s death led to succession becoming uncertain due to Peter Alexeyevich becoming the only remaining agnatic Romanov after the tsar, in 1722 Peter I issued a law allowing him to choose his successor, but he never used it.

Pretender 
In 1730, Peter Alexeyevich who was by then Peter II died, he was the last of the agnatic House of Romanov. Two years after Peter II died, a imposter claiming to be Peter Petrovich appeared and was quickly found and executed.

References

1715 births

1719 deaths
Russian tsareviches
House of Romanov
Heirs apparent who never acceded
Burials at the Annunciation Church of the Alexander Nevsky Lavra
Royalty who died as children